Crawfordsville is a city in Washington County, Iowa, United States. It is part of the Iowa City, Iowa Metropolitan Statistical Area. The population was 277 at the 2020 census.

History
Crawfordsville is named for the Crawford family of pioneer settlers.

The first private meeting of what would become the Republican Party came when Whig Party defectors met privately in Crawfordsville in February, 1854. The meeting was to lay the groundwork for the creation of a new political party. The first public meeting was held in Ripon, Wisconsin one month later.

Geography
Crawfordsville is located at  (41.215393, -91.537844).

Demographics

2010 census
At the 2010 census there were 264 people in 110 households, including 76 families, in the city. The racial makup of the city was 93.9% White, 0.8% African American, 1.1% Native American, 3.4% from other races, and 0.8% from two or more races. Hispanic or Latino of any race were 9.1%.

Of the 110 households 27.3% had children under the age of 18 living with them, 58.2% were married couples living together, 8.2% had a female householder with no husband present, 2.7% had a male householder with no wife present, and 30.9% were non-families. 28.2% of households were one person and 13.6% were one person aged 65 or older. The average household size was 2.40 and the average family size was 2.97.

The median age was 45.3 years. 23.9% of residents were under the age of 18; 8% were between the ages of 18 and 24; 17.7% were from 25 to 44; 32.6% were from 45 to 64; and 17.8% were 65 or older. The gender makeup of the city was 48.9% male and 51.1% female.

2000 census
At the 2000 census there were 295 people in 117 households, including 78 families, in the city. The racial makup of the city was 99.66% White and 0.34% Native American. Hispanic or Latino of any race were 1.02%.

Of the 117 households 37.6% had children under the age of 18 living with them, 54.7% were married couples living together, 8.5% had a female householder with no husband present, and 33.3% were non-families. 29.1% of households were one person and 11.1% were one person aged 65 or older. The average household size was 2.52 and the average family size was 3.13.

The age distribution was 29.8% under the age of 18, 6.4% from 18 to 24, 30.5% from 25 to 44, 16.3% from 45 to 64, and 16.9% 65 or older. The median age was 36 years. For every 100 females, there were 102.1 males. For every 100 females age 18 and over, there were 99.0 males.

The median household income was $39,063 and the median family income  was $38,571. Males had a median income of $28,036 versus $22,813 for females. The per capita income for the city was $17,238. None of the families and 2.0% of the population were living below the poverty line, including no under eighteens and 6.1% of those over 64.

Education
WACO Community School District operates local public schools.

References

External links

 
City-Data Comprehensive Statistical Data and more about Crawfordsville

Cities in Iowa
Cities in Washington County, Iowa
Iowa City metropolitan area
Populated places established in 1891
1891 establishments in Iowa